Troller Veículos Especiais S/A (Troller) was a Brazilian off-road vehicle manufacturer. Founded in 1995 in Horizonte, Ceará, it became a subsidiary of Ford in 2007. Troller T4 was a flagship vehicle, which had featured successfully in several rally races around the world, including the Dakar Rally.

Etymology 
The name Troller is a Brazilian adaptation of the English word Troll, which refers to a character of the Scandinavian legends that dwells forests and caves of Norway. A character that protects its visitors, as well as being faithful, loyal and bring luck, but loses patience when they threaten their habitat.

History

Troller started in 1995, by Rogério Farias. In April 1996, the first prototype was built.

In 1997, the company was bought by the entrepreneur Mário Araripe, who formed a partnership with Rogério Farias; the first gasoline-powered T4 was built. The mass-production of the vehicle started in 1999, when a factory was built in the municipality of Horizonte.

In 2005, a manufacturing plant opened in Angola to build the T4 for the African market.

On 14 December 2009, a Troller made the news when it cleared São Paulo's flooded streets during a news broadcast, at the time, the company played along and tried to find the driver. The T4 received a redesign in 2014.

The Troller plant in Horizonte was closed by the end of 2021, with Ford ending all its production in Brazil. The special tax regime, valid until 2025, would also be linked to the factory.

Models
Troller Pantanal (2006-2008)
Troller T4 3.2 Turbodiesel (2015–2021)

See also
TAC Stark - another Brazilian four-wheel drive vehicle.

References

External links
 

Brazilian companies established in 1995
Car manufacturers of Brazil
Defunct companies of Brazil
Defunct defence companies of Brazil
Vehicle manufacturing companies established in 1995
Companies based in Ceará
Off-road vehicles
All-wheel-drive vehicles
Automotive industry in Brazil
Ford Motor Company
Ford Motor Company Marques
2007 mergers and acquisitions
1995 establishments in Brazil
Brazilian brands
Vehicle manufacturing companies disestablished in 2021
Manufacturing companies disestablished in 2021